Jules Develle (12 April 1845 – 30 October 1919) was a French politician.

Biography
He was born in Bar-le-Duc to Claude Charles Develle, an insurance agent, and Anne Marguerite Rousselot. He studied law and became a lawyer. He discovered his passion for political activity as a secretary of Jules Grévy. He was then appointed prefect but he was removed later on because of his political thoughts (1877). He was 13 times French Minister during the Third Republic including Minister of Justice, Minister of Agriculture and Minister of Foreign Affairs in 1893.

He died in Paris in 1919.

References

1845 births
1919 deaths
People from Bar-le-Duc
Politicians of the French Third Republic
French Ministers of Agriculture
French Foreign Ministers
French Ministers of Justice
Senators of Meuse (department)